Samuel Jason Mathews (born February 9, 1971) is a former American football offensive tackle in the National Football League (NFL). He played for the Indianapolis Colts (1994–1997) and the Tennessee Oilers/Titans (1998–2004).

Early years
Jason Mathews attended Bridge City High School in Bridge City, Texas, where he lettered in football, baseball, and track.  After his graduation in 1989, he attended Brigham Young University for one year, playing defensive lineman.  He spent his next three years of college eligibility at Texas A&M University.  Mathews lettered all three years he was at Texas A&M, and started at right tackle during his junior and senior years.  Mathews left A&M at the end of his college eligibility, one credit shy of graduation.

NFL years
Mathews was selected by the Indianapolis Colts in the third round of the 1994 NFL Draft to play right tackle and special teams.  In his first year with the Colts, he played in 10 games.  In his second year, he was the starting right tackle in all 16 regular-season games and the team's 3 playoff games as they fell just short of the AFC Championship.  He played for the Colts for two more years, as left tackle, right tackle, reserve tackle, and on special teams.

In 1998, Mathews signed with the Tennessee Oilers (later the Tennessee Titans) as a free agent.  The team earned the AFC Champshionship in 1999, and played the St. Louis Rams in Super Bowl XXXIV. The Titans list Mathews as being 6'5" tall and weighing 285 pounds.

In the 2003 offseason, Mathews returned to school so that he could finish the requirements for his degree.  In 2004, Mathews joined other members of the community in personally greeting President George W. Bush as he visited Nashville.  Mathews continued to play for the Titans, wearing number 76, until 2005.

Post-NFL
In 2005, Mathews announced his retirement from football.  He became the associate dean at Montgomery Bell Academy for 11th and 12th grades, and assisted with the school's football program. In 2006, Mathews began working as a facility coordinator for D1 Sports Training in Nashville. The facility is owned by Peyton Manning.

Mathews has taught Seminar and coached the football team at The Ensworth School. He has served as the Director of Admission at Brentwood Academy for the last 6 years. He is presently the Dean of Community Engagement at Brentwood Academy. He also coaches middle school offensive line at BA.

Personal life
Mathews is married to the former Kim Roy, a fellow native of Bridge City. They have one son and one daughter, Bryce and Baylee. His son, Bryce, plays offensive tackle at the Liberty University. He has a brother Jeff who coaches high school football in Texas.

References

External links
Museum of the Gulf Coast Jason Mathews Biography

1971 births
Living people
People from Orange, Texas
Players of American football from Texas
American football offensive tackles
BYU Cougars football players
Texas A&M Aggies football players
Indianapolis Colts players
Tennessee Oilers players
Tennessee Titans players